Palau'amine is a toxic alkaloid compound synthesized naturally by Stylotella agminata, a species of sea sponge found in the southwest Pacific Ocean. The name of the molecule derives from the island nation of Palau, near which the sponges are found.

The substance was first isolated and described in 1993. Containing nine nitrogen atoms, the molecule is considered highly complex.  The precise atomic structure was pinned down in 2007, and two years later the molecule was synthesized in the lab of Phil Baran at the Scripps Research Institute in La Jolla, California.  Early efforts towards its synthesis were directed at a misassigned structure featuring a cis- rather than trans-5/5 ring fusion, an error that was made because the trans-5/5 ring system is some 6 kcal/mol less stable than the cis-configured system.

Biomimetic synthesis 
Based on the hypothesized biosynthesis of palau'amine, a proposed pathway to this dimeric pyrrole-imidazole alkaloid includes a key oxidation of a β-ketoester with manganese(III) acetate to initiate a cascade radical cyclization, producing an ageliferin skeleton.

Biological effects
Palau'amine is a proteasome inhibitor.

References 

Alkaloids
Organochlorides
Halogen-containing alkaloids
Guanidine alkaloids
Amines
Spiro compounds
Nitrogen heterocycles
Proteasome inhibitors